Ateca Robinson is a former Fijian international lawn bowler.

Bowls career
In 1969 she won the fours silver medal with Elva Bradley, Olive Patton, Clarice Woolley at the 1969 World Outdoor Bowls Championship in Sydney, Australia. She also won a bronze medal in the team event (Taylor Trophy).

References

Living people
Fijian female bowls players
Year of birth missing (living people)